Lower Hopewell is an unincorporated community in Chester County, Pennsylvania, United States. It lies at an elevation of 322 feet (98 m). The community was part of the now-dissolved Borough of Hopewell.

References

Unincorporated communities in Chester County, Pennsylvania
Unincorporated communities in Pennsylvania